Kalateh-ye Hasan may refer to:
 Kalateh-ye Hasan, Chenaran, Razavi Khorasan Province
 Kalateh-ye Hasan, South Khorasan

See also
Kalateh-ye Hasan Qoli